EDDB may refer to:

 Berlin Schönefeld Airport, former ICAO code of airport up to 2020
 Berlin Brandenburg Airport, ICAO code of airport since 2020